Radovan was Croatian sculptor and architect who lived in Trogir in the 13th century. Virtually no information exists about the personality and career of this artist, save for his monumental Romanesque portal of the Trogir cathedral.

Radovan inscribed his name and the year of making of the main portal, 1240, on the lunette above the entrance:

The text informs us that master Radovan was the best in the art of sculpture and that the project was completed in the time when a Tuscan, Treguan from Florence, had been the bishop of Trogir.

That Radovan was a native son of Trogir (Traù) is attested, among other things, by his name, which figures frequently in Trogir's municipal archives in the 13th century.

The portal consists of four parts: on the doorjamb, the nude figures of Adam and Eve, supported by lions; inside are numerous reliefs depicting the Labors of the Months as well as hunting scenes; and finally in the middle are scenes from the life of Christ: from the Annunciation to the Resurrection – positioned in arches around the tympanum. Finally, in tympanum is the Birth of Christ. The figures are very realistic, recalling French Gothic sculpture, including the sculpture at Chartres Cathedral.

See also
Cathedral of St. Lawrence, Trogir
Culture of Croatia
Romanesque architecture
Gothic architecture
Trogir
Dalmatia
Radovan

References 

13th-century Croatian people
Romanesque artists
Croatian art
Croatian sculptors
History of Trogir